Peckham by-election may refer to several by-elections in the Peckham area of London:

 1908 Peckham by-election, a Conservative gain from the Liberals
 1936 Peckham by-election, a Labour gain from the Conservatives
 1982 Peckham by-election, retained by Labour